is a town located in Shiki District, Nara Prefecture, Japan. As of March 31, 2017, the town has an estimated population of 32,241. The total area is 21.09 km². It has many temples and shrines including Jinrakuji.

Geography 
Located in the center of the Nara Basin, the majority of the land is flat. The Yamato River flows through the eastern portion of the town.

Surrounding municipalities 
 Nara Prefecture
 Tenri
 Sakurai
 Kashihara
 Miyake
 Kōryō

Education 
 Tawaramoto Agriculture School
 Koutou Special School
 Shiki High School

References

External links 

 
  

 
Towns in Nara Prefecture